Ervin Eleskovic (born 8 May 1987 in Bileća, SFR Yugoslavia) is a former professional tennis player from Sweden.

Singles Titles

External links

Ervin Eleskovix on ESPN

Living people
1987 births
Swedish male tennis players